Michael Shiell OFM, Guardian of Killeigh, fl. 1693–98.

Shiell was a member of the Ó Siadhail family of Kingdom of Uí Failghe, who were prominent County Offaly and County Laois in the late medieval/early modern era. Shiell was a member of the Franciscan order, and became the guardian of the Franciscan friary at Killeigh, County Offaly, in 1693. In 1698, eight individuals signed a document acknowledging that they had received chalices, pyxes, cups, an oil box, ciborium, a bell and vestments of the friary for safekeeping. Michael Shiell was one of the eight signatories, as was one William Shiell, who received at least three of the items. Krasnodebska-D'Aughton states that "both were probably members of the Ó Siadhail family, who had long associations with the Franciscans in the midlands."

See also

 Mícheál Ó Cléirigh
 Feardorcha Ó Mealláin
 Aodh Mac Cathmhaoil

References

 "Franciscan Chalices 1600-50" by Malgorzata Krasnodebska-D'Aughton, p. 301, "The Irish Franciscans 1534-1990", ed. Bhreathnach, MacMahon and McCafferty, Four Courts Press, 2009.

External links
 http://www.killeigh.com/
 https://www.offalyhistory.com/reading-resources/history/history-by-place/killeigh-abbey

Irish Friars Minor
People from County Offaly
17th-century Irish people